David Wax Museum is a folk and roots rock band blending traditional Mexican son music with Americana in what they call "Mexo-Americana". Husband and wife, David Wax and Suz Slezak, are its core members. Most of the band's albums have been self-released, supported by grassroots efforts and an active touring schedule.

History
David Wax Museum released its first album, I Turned Off Thinking About, in 2008. Its second album, Carpenter Bird (2009), included many tracks that would become staples in the band's live shows.

The band had its breakthrough after winning a contest for a spot at the 2010 Newport Folk Festival. Paste magazine dubbed the band "the breakout act" of the festival. The band was the winner in the Americana category in the 2010 Boston Music Awards.

In 2011, the band released the critically acclaimed album Everything Is Saved, featuring the song "Born with a Broken Heart", which was named Song of the Year in the Boston Music Awards. After playing South by Southwest in 2011, Craig Duff of Time magazine dubbed David Wax Museum one of the "Ten Acts That Rocked South by Southwest". They went on to play the main stage on the final day of the Newport Folk Festival. On the night of their performance, The Huffington Post ran a profile of the band in which Rob Kirkpatrick called them "The Best Band You Might Not Know".

The band released its fourth full-length album, Knock Knock Get Up, in late summer 2012. The Huffington Post called it "louder, richer, fuller, less minimalist and more mature" than the band's previous releases and described it as "an album that will challenge fans" and "leav[e] [them] wanting to play it again." On the day of the official album release, The New York Times published a Q & A with band members Wax and Slezak.

Musical style
David Wax became interested in rural Mexican folk music after attending Deep Springs College and Harvard University and focuses on different styles of son music. Wax, who hails from Columbia, Missouri, sings and primarily plays the jarana, a Mexican instrument similar to a guitar.

Slezak is a fiddler and vocalist who in the Museum also plays quijada, a percussion instrument made from a donkey's jawbone.

New York Times writer James C. McKinley Jr. described the band's style as "a lively and rustic cross-border mix: lonesome Appalachian harmonies over mariachi horn lines and rhythms you might hear at a rural dance in Veracruz or San Luis Potosí."

Discography

Albums

Music videos

References

External links
 

American folk musical groups